Elio Vito (born 12 November 1960) is an Italian politician, member of the Chamber of Deputies of Italy from 1992 to 2022.

Biography
Vito graduated in Sociology from the University of Naples.

He became a member of Forza Italia in 1994, and of People of Freedom in 2008. From 1988 to 1992, he was a councillor for Naples. In 1992, he joined the Chamber of Deputies of Italy.

In 2008, he was appointed as Minister for Parliamentary Relations under Silvio Berlusconi, a position he held until 2011.

References

1960 births
Politicians from Naples
Living people
Forza Italia politicians
The People of Freedom politicians
Government ministers of Italy
University of Naples Federico II alumni
Deputies of Legislature XI of Italy
Deputies of Legislature XII of Italy
Deputies of Legislature XIII of Italy
Deputies of Legislature XIV of Italy
Deputies of Legislature XV of Italy
Deputies of Legislature XVI of Italy
Deputies of Legislature XVII of Italy
Deputies of Legislature XVIII of Italy
20th-century Italian politicians
21st-century Italian politicians